This article lists players who have captained the senior Cork county hurling team in the Munster Senior Hurling Championship and the All-Ireland Senior Hurling Championship. The captain was usually chosen from the club that won the Cork Senior Hurling Championship; however, as of 2008, the captain has been appointed by the manager.

List of captains

1888–1899

1900–1909

1910–1919

1920–1929

1930–1939

1940–1949

1950–1959

1960–1969

1970–1979

1980–1989

1990–1999

2000–2009

2010–present

References

 
Hurling
Cork